Dave's Picks Volume 31 is a 3-CD live album by the rock band the Grateful Dead.  It contains the complete concert recorded on December 3, 1979 at the Uptown Theatre in Chicago, Illinois.  It also includes three songs performed at the same venue the following night.  It was released on July 26, 2019, in a limited edition of 20,000 numbered copies.

Uptown Theatre 

The Uptown Theatre is a large, very ornate theater that was built in 1925 and was originally used for showing silent movies.  It seats about 4,400 people.  From January 1978 to February 1981 the Grateful Dead played there 17 times.  Still standing, the theater has been closed since 1981.

Critical reception 
On AllMusic, Timothy Monger said, "Plucked from a Chicago run at the end of 1979, Dave's Picks, Vol. 31 features a jaunty trio of sets from the Grateful Dead, who were at the point still in the honeymoon phase with their newest recruit, keyboardist Brent Mydland."

In Glide Magazine, Doug Collette wrote, "In front of close to forty-five hundred attendees, the Grateful Dead were opening a three-night run... and proceeded to blend together tried-and-true material like "Brown-Eyed Women" and "Wharf Rat" with fairly new compositions such as "Alabama Getaway", "Althea" and "Fire On The Mountain"."

Track listing 
Disc 1
First set:
"Alabama Getaway" (Jerry Garcia, Robert Hunter) – 7:05
"Promised Land" (Chuck Berry) – 4:35
"Brown-Eyed Women" (Garcia, Hunter) – 5:48
"El Paso" (Marty Robbins) – 4:26
"Ramble On Rose" (Garcia, Hunter) – 7:44
"It's All Over Now" (Bobby Womack, Shirley Womack) – 8:58
"Jack-a-Roe" (traditional, arranged by Grateful Dead) – 5:39
"Lazy Lightning" (Bob Weir, John Perry Barlow) – 3:16
"Supplication" (Weir, Barlow) – 5:25
"Althea" (Garcia, Hunter) – 11:33
"The Music Never Stopped" (Weir, Barlow) – 8:17
Disc 2
Second set:
"Scarlet Begonias" (Garcia, Hunter) – 11:42
"Fire on the Mountain" (Mickey Hart, Hunter) – 15:28
"Samson and Delilah" (traditional, arranged by Grateful Dead) – 7:45
"Terrapin Station" (Garcia, Hunter) – 14:11
"Playing in the Band" (Weir, Hart, Hunter) – 11:20
"Drums" (Hart, Bill Kreutzmann) – 10:02
Disc 3
"Space" (Garcia, Phil Lesh, Weir) – 2:27
"Lost Sailor" (Weir, Barlow) – 7:06
"Saint of Circumstance" (Weir, Barlow) – 6:11
"Wharf Rat" (Garcia, Hunter) – 11:05
"Truckin'" (Garcia, Lesh, Weir, Hunter) – 9:33
Encore:
"Johnny B. Goode" (Berry) – 4:49
Uptown Theatre – December 4, 1979:
"Estimated Prophet" (Weir, Barlow) – 12:01
"Franklin's Tower" (Garcia, Kreutzmann, Hunter) – 10:12
"Jam" (Grateful Dead) – 10:27

Personnel 
Grateful Dead
Jerry Garcia – guitar, vocals
Mickey Hart – drums
Bill Kreutzmann – drums
Phil Lesh – bass
Brent Mydland – keyboards, vocals
Bob Weir – guitar, vocals
Production
Produced by Grateful Dead
Produced for release by David Lemieux
Associate Producers: Ivette Ramos & Doran Tyson
Recording: Dan Healy
Mastering: David Glasser
Art direction, design: Steve Vance
Cover art: Tyler Crook
Photos: Jay Blakesberg, Kirk West
Liner notes essay "A Little Bolt of Inspiration": David Lemieux

References 

31
Rhino Records live albums
2019 live albums